Irma Georgiyevna Makhinia (born 6 September 2002) is a Russian ski jumper. She won a silver medal at the 2022 Winter Olympics in the mixed team event.

References

Living people
2002 births
Ski jumpers at the 2022 Winter Olympics
Olympic ski jumpers of Russia
Russian female ski jumpers
Olympic silver medalists for the Russian Olympic Committee athletes
Medalists at the 2022 Winter Olympics
Olympic medalists in ski jumping